The 6th Grey Cup was played on December 5, 1914, before 10,500 fans at Varsity Stadium at Toronto.

The Toronto Argonauts defeated the University of Toronto Varsity Blues 14–2.

External links
 
 

06
Grey Cup, 6th
Grey Cup
1914 in Ontario
December 1914 sports events
1910s in Toronto
Toronto Argonauts
Toronto Varsity Blues football